The Return of Jesse James is a 1950 American western film directed by Arthur Hilton and starring John Ireland, Ann Dvorak and Henry Hull. It was produced and distributed by the independent Lippert Pictures. The film's art direction was by Frank Paul Sylos and Vin Taylor.

Plot
The James gang rides again with the addition of a dead ringer (John Ireland) for the dead Jesse James.

Cast
 John Ireland as Johnny Callum 
 Ann Dvorak as Susan (Sue) Ellen Younger  
 Henry Hull as Hank Younger 
 Reed Hadley as Frank James  
 Hugh O'Brian as Lem Younger  
 Clifton Young as Bob Ford  
 Tommy Noonan as Charlie Ford 
 Victor Kilian as Westfield Sheriff Rigby  
 Margia Dean as Marge  
 Sid Melton as Saloon Waiter-Piano Player  
 Byron Foulger as Rufe Dakin  
 Paul Maxey as Elmer Galway  
 Peter Marshall as George  
 Norman Leavitt as Dr. Hallstrom  
 Barbara Woodell as Ann—Frank's Wife  
 I. Stanford Jolley as Commissioner Morton 
 Robin Short as Gang Member  
 Jay Barney as Cap'n Andy Milburn  
 Hank Patterson as Clay County Marshal

Production
The film was meant to be a sequel to the very successful I Shot Jesse James (1949), also financed by Robert L. Lippert. John Ireland reprised his role as Robert Ford. The film was meant to mark the directorial debut of James Wong Howe who would co direct with editor Arthur Hilton. Filming began on May 1, 1950.

References

Bibliography
 Fetrow, Alan G. Feature Films, 1950–1959: A United States Filmography. McFarland, 1999.

External links
 

1950 films
1950 Western (genre) films
American Western (genre) films
Lippert Pictures films
American black-and-white films
Films directed by Arthur Hilton
1950s English-language films
1950s American films